Earl of Merioneth was a title in the Peerage of the United Kingdom created in 1947 along with the Duke of Edinburgh and the Baron Greenwich for Philip Mountbatten, later Prince Philip, upon his marriage to Princess Elizabeth, later Queen Elizabeth II.

Merionethshire is one of thirteen historic counties of Wales, a vice county and a former administrative county.

Earls of Merioneth (1947)

| Prince PhilipMountbatten1947–2021also: Duke of Edinburgh and Baron Greenwich (1947)
| 
| 10 June 1921Mon Repos, Corfuson of Prince Andrew of Greece and Denmark and Princess Alice of Battenberg
| Princess Elizabeth20 November 19474 children
| 9 April 2021Windsor Castle, Windsoraged 99
|-

| Prince Charles House of Windsor2021–2022also: Prince of Wales and Earl of Chester (1958), Duke of Cornwall, Duke of Rothesay (1952), Duke of Edinburgh and Baron Greenwich (2021)
| 
| 14 November 1948Buckingham Palace, Londonson of Prince Philip and Queen Elizabeth II
| Lady Diana Spencer29 July 198128 August 19962 childrenCamilla Parker Bowles9 April 2005
|  now  old
|-
| colspan=5|Prince Charles succeeded as Charles III in 2022 upon his mother's death, and his hereditary titles merged in the Crown.
|}

References

 
Extinct earldoms in the Peerage of the United Kingdom
Merionethshire
Prince Philip, Duke of Edinburgh
Noble titles created in 1947
Charles III
1947 establishments in the United Kingdom
2022 disestablishments in the United Kingdom
British and Irish peerages which merged in the Crown